International School – Zurich North (ISZN) is a multi-cultural day school for students aged 3 to 18, located in the north-eastern suburbs of Zurich, Switzerland. The school community consists of over 200 students from approx. 35 different countries.

ISZN was acquired by Cognita on 21 June 2019.

Grades 9 and 10 follow a 2-year programme leading to the International General Certificate of Secondary Education (IGCSE) by Cambridge International Examinations (CIE) and Grades 11 and 12 sit the A-Level Examinations from Pearson Edexcel or Cambridge International Examinations. Both CIE and Edexcel qualifications are recognized by many universities around the world.

Accreditation

By Swiss Authorities
ISZN's Kindergarten and primary education programs (Primary Years Programme, Grade 1 to 5) are approved by the bureau for elementary school (Volksschulamt), administration for education (Bildungsdirektion), canton of Zurich.

Also ISZN's secondary education program (Secondary School Programme, Grade 6 to 9) is approved by the bureau for elementary school (Volksschulamt), administration for education (Bildungsdirektion), canton of Zurich as Sekundarstufe.

However ISZN's upper secondary education programs (Middle School Programme, grades 9 to 10, High School Programme, grades 11 to 12) are neither approved as a Mittelschule by the bureau for gymnasial and vocational education (Mittelschul- und Berufsbildungsamt), administration of education (Bildungsdirektion), canton of Zurich, nor approved by the Swiss Federal State Secretariat for Education, Research and Innovation (SERI).

By International Authorities 
The IB Primary Years Programme (PYP) is the established worldwide standard for an educational programme at the Primary level, offered by many top international schools. The International Baccalaureate Organization authorized ISZN in 2006 to offer the Primary Years Programme.

ISZN are also a recognized and authorized examinations center for Cambridge International Exams and Pearson Edexcel.

Campuses and Facilities 
ISZN occupies the ground and first floor of a modern building for Primary School at Industriestrasse 50. The Secondary School campus is located at Industriestrasse 42. Both are in Wallisellen.

The Schools has Multipurpose Halls, stages for performances, Science and Computer laboratories, cafeteria, and a playground area. They also have weekly access to a local gymnasium and swimming pool and make use of a number of other local facilities, sports grounds and ice skating rinks.

References

External links
 IB World School
 International School Zurich North
 Swiss Group of International Schools

International schools in Switzerland
International Baccalaureate schools in Switzerland
Schools in Zürich
Upper secondary schools in the Canton of Zürich
Private schools in Switzerland
1999 establishments in Switzerland
Educational institutions established in 1999